Amy Caron (born November 2, 1984) is a professional skateboarder living in Long Beach, California.

Skateboarding
Caron is at the forefront of a small group of professional female skaters.  She began skateboarding at the age of 12, and is currently sponsored by Meow Skateboards. Caron has stood on the X Games podium in the bronze-medal position three times—2003 in Park and 2007 and 2008 in Street. She is co-founder of the skateboarding magazine, Bigfoot Skateboard Magazine, along with co-founder and fellow skateboarder Meghan McGuire.

Skateboard videos
Caron is heavily featured on the skate DVD AKA: Girl Skater.  It features footage of her 1st place win at the Gallaz Skate Jam in Australia.  Caron's prize was a new Ford car, which she crashed in the stadium.

She is also featured in the renowned female skate DVD Getting Nowhere Faster.

References

External links
Girls Skate Network Interview

American skateboarders
Female skateboarders
Living people
X Games athletes
1984 births
Sportspeople from Huntington Beach, California
American sportswomen
21st-century American women